The 2016–17 Serie A1 is the 98th season of the Serie A1, Italy's premier Water polo league.

Team information

The following 14 clubs compete in the Serie A1 during the 2016–17 season:

Head coaches

Regular season (Prima Fase)

Standings

Season statistics

Top goalscorers

Number of teams by regions

References

External links
 Italian Water Polo Federaration 

Seasons in Italian water polo competitions
Italy
Serie A1
Serie A1
2016 in water polo
2017 in water polo